Ronald Clayton Cease (born March 3, 1931), is an American politician who was a member of the Oregon House of Representatives and Oregon State Senate.

Cease was born in Britton, South Dakota in 1931 and attended the Vanport Extension Center (later Portland State University). He was a professor of Public Administration and Political Science at Portland State University from 1966 to 2000. From 2001 to 2008, he sat on the Oregon Department of Forestry's (ODF) Committee for Family Forestlands. His wife, Jane Cease, also was an Oregon state legislator, serving stints in the State House of Senate.

References

1931 births
Living people
Democratic Party members of the Oregon House of Representatives
People from Britton, South Dakota
Politicians from Portland, Oregon
Portland State University alumni
Portland State University faculty